The deepest part of a sulcus, such as the sulci in the human cerebral cortex.

Neuroanatomy